Lauderi is a village in Ludza Municipality in the historical region of Latgale, and the Latgale Planning Region in Latvia.

External links 
  
 

Ludza Municipality
Towns and villages in Latvia
Latgale